The House of Hope Presbyterian Church in Saint Paul, Minnesota was founded in 1907, by the merger of two churches that were founded in 1849 and 1855.

Its building was designed by noted architect Ralph Adams Cram starting in 1909;  the church was completed in 1914.  It is a Gothic Revival style church with flying buttresses needed to support walls thin enough for stained glass windows.

The church was expanded in 1959.  It received a 2014 St. Paul Heritage Preservation Award for completion of a major restoration of the church and its bell tower costing $3.2 million that including replacing the slate roof and adding copper flashings.

References

External links
House of Hope Presbyterian Church, official website

Presbyterian churches in Minnesota
Gothic Revival architecture in Minnesota